Peptidoglycan recognition protein 1, PGLYRP1, also known as TAG7, is an antibacterial and pro-inflammatory innate immunity protein that in humans is encoded by the PGLYRP1 gene.

Discovery 
PGLYRP1 was discovered independently by two laboratories in 1998. Håkan Steiner and coworkers, using a differential display screen, identified and cloned Peptidoglycan Recognition Protein (PGRP) in a moth (Trichoplusia ni) and based on this sequence discovered and cloned mouse and human PGRP orthologs. Sergei Kiselev and coworkers discovered and cloned a protein from a mouse adenocarcinoma with the same sequence as mouse PGRP, which they named Tag7. Human PGRP was a founding member of a family of four PGRP genes found in humans that were named PGRP-S, PGRP-L, PGRP-Iα, and PGRP-Iβ (for short, long, and intermediate size transcripts, by analogy to insect PGRPs). Their gene symbols were subsequently changed to PGLYRP1 (peptidoglycan recognition protein 1), PGLYRP2 (peptidoglycan recognition protein 2), PGLYRP3 (peptidoglycan recognition protein 3), and PGLYRP4 (peptidoglycan recognition protein 4), respectively, by the Human Genome Organization Gene Nomenclature Committee, and this nomenclature is currently also used for other mammalian PGRPs. In 2005, Roy Mariuzza and coworkers crystallized human PGLYRP1 and solved its structure.

Tissue distribution and secretion 
PGLYRP1 has the highest level of expression of all mammalian PGRPs. PGLYRP1 is highly constitutively expressed in the bone marrow and in the tertiary granules of polymorphonuclear leukocytes (neutrophils and eosinophils), and to a lesser extent in activated macrophages and fetal liver. PGLYRP1 is also expressed in lactating mammary gland, and to a much lower level in corneal epithelium in the eye, in the inflamed skin, spleen, thymus, and in epithelial cells in the respiratory and intestinal tracts. PGLYRP1 is prominently expressed in intestinal Peyer's patches in microfold (M) cells and is also one of the markers for differentiation of T helper 17 (Th17) cells into T regulatory (Treg) cells in mice. Mouse PGLYRP1 is expressed in the developing brain and this expression is influenced by the intestinal microbiome. Expression of PGLYRP1 in rat brain is induced by sleep deprivation and in mouse brain by ischemia.

Human PGLYRP1 is also found in the serum after release from leukocyte granules by exocytosis. PGLYRP1 is present in camel’s milk at 120 µg/ml and in polymorphonuclear leukocytes’ granules at 2.9 mg/109 cells.

Structure 
As with most PGRPs, PGLYRP1 has one carboxy-terminal peptidoglycan-binding type 2 amidase domain (also known as a PGRP domain), which, however, does not have amidase enzymatic activity. This PGRP domain consists of three alpha helices, five beta strands and coils, and an N-terminal segment (residues 1–30, the PGRP-specific segment), whose structure varies substantially among PGRPs. PGLYRP1 has three pairs of conserved cysteines, which form three disulfide bonds at positions 9 and 133, 25 and 70, and 46 and 52 in human PGLYRP1. The Cys46–Cys52 disulfide is broadly conserved in invertebrate and vertebrate PRGPs, Cys9–Cys133 disulfide is conserved in all mammalian PGRPs, and Cys25–Cys70 disulfide is unique to mammalian PGLYRP1, PGLYRP3, and PGLYRP4, but not found in amidase-active PGLYRP2. Human PGLYRP1 has a 25 Å-long peptidoglycan-binding cleft whose walls are formed by two α-helices and the floor by a β-sheet.

Human PGLYRP1 is secreted and forms disulfide-linked homodimers. The structure of the disulfide-linked dimer is unknown, as the crystal structure of only monomeric human PGLYRP1 was solved, because the crystallized protein lacked the 8 N-terminal amino acids, including Cys8, which is likely involved in the formation of the disulfide-linked dimer. Rat PGLYRP1 is also likely to form disulfide-linked dimers as it contains Cys in the same position as Cys8 in human PGLYRP1, whereas mouse and bovine PGLYRP1 do not contain this Cys and likely do not form disulfide-linked dimers.

Camel PGLYRP1 can form two non-disulfide-linked dimers: the first with peptidoglycan-binding sites of two participating molecules fully exposed at the opposite ends of the dimer, and the second with peptidoglycan-binding sites buried at the interface and the opposite sides exposed at the ends of the dimer. This arrangement is unique for camel PGLYRP1.

PGLYRP1 is glycosylated and glycosylation is required for its bactericidal activity.

Functions 
The PGLYRP1 protein plays an important role in the innate immune response.

Peptidoglycan binding 
PGLYRP1 binds peptidoglycan, a polymer of β(1-4)-linked N-acetylglucosamine (GlcNAc) and N-acetylmuramic acid (MurNAc) cross-linked by short peptides, the main component of bacterial cell wall. Human PGLYRP1 binds GlcNAc-MurNAc-tripeptide with high affinity (Kd = 5.5 x 10−8 M) and MurNAc-tripeptide, MurNAc-tetrapeptide, and MurNAc-pentapeptide with Kd = 0.9-3.3 x 10−7 M with a preference for meso-diaminopimelic acid (m-DAP) over L-lysine-containing peptidoglycan fragments. m-DAP is present in the third position of peptidoglycan peptide in Gram-negative bacteria and Gram-positive bacilli, whereas L-lysine is in this position in peptidoglycan peptide in Gram-positive cocci. Smaller peptidoglycan fragments do not bind or bind with much lower affinity.

Camel PGLYRP1 binds MurNAc-dipeptide with low affinity (Kd = 10−7 M) and it also binds bacterial lipopolysaccharide with Kd = 1.6 x 10−9 M and lipoteichoic acid with Kd = 2.4 x 10−8 M at binding sites outside the canonical peptidoglycan-binding cleft with the ligands and PGLYRP1 forming tetramers. Such tetramers are unique to camel PGLYRP1 and are not found in human PGLYRP1 because of stearic hindrance.

Bactericidal activity 
Human PGLYRP1 is directly bactericidal for both Gram-positive (Bacillus subtilis, Bacillus licheniformis, Lactobacillus acidophilus, Staphylococcus aureus, Streptococcus pyogenes) and Gram-negative (Escherichia coli, Proteus vulgaris, Salmonella enterica, Shigella sonnei, Pseudomonas aeruginosa) bacteria and is also active against Chlamydia trachomatis. Mouse and bovine PGLYRP1 have antibacterial activity against Bacillus megaterium, Staphylococcus hemolyticus, S. aureus, E. coli, and S. enterica, and bovine PGLYRP1 also has antifungal activity against Cryptococcus neoformans.

In Gram-positive bacteria, human PGLYRP1 binds to the separation sites of the newly formed daughter cells, created by bacterial peptidoglycan-lytic endopeptidases, LytE and LytF in B. subtilis, which separate the daughter cells after cell division. These cell-separating endopeptidases likely expose PGLYRP1-binding muramyl peptides, as shown by co-localization of PGLYRP1 and LytE and LytF at the cell-separation sites, and no binding of PGLYRP1 to other regions of the cell wall with highly cross-linked peptidoglycan. This localization is necessary for the bacterial killing, because mutants that lack LytE and LytF endopeptidases and do not separate after cell division, do not bind PGLYRP1, and are also not readily killed by PGLYRP1. In Gram-negative bacteria (E. coli), PGLYRP1 binds to the outer membrane. In both Gram-positive and Gram-negative bacteria PGLYRP1 stays bound to the cell envelope and does not enter the cytoplasm.

The mechanism of killing by PGLYRP1 is based on induction of lethal envelope stress and production of reactive oxygen species in bacteria and the subsequent shutdown of transcription and translation. PGLYRP1-induced bacterial killing does not involve cell membrane permeabilization, which is typical for defensins and other antimicrobial peptides, cell wall hydrolysis, or osmotic shock.

Human PGLYRP1 has synergistic bactericidal activity with lysozyme and antibacterial peptides. Streptococci produce a protein (SP1) that inhibits antibacterial activity of human PGLYRP1.

Defense against infections 
PGLYRP1 plays a limited role in host defense against infections. PGLYRP1-deficient mice are more sensitive to systemic infections with non-pathogenic bacteria (Micrococcus luteus and B. subtilis) and to P. aeruginosa-induced keratitis, but not to systemic infections with pathogenic bacteria (S. aureus and E. coli). Intravenous administration of PGLYRP1 protects mice from systemic Listeria monocytogenes infection.

Maintaining microbiome 
Mouse PGLYRP1 plays a role in maintaining healthy microbiome, as PGLYRP1-deficient mice have significant changes in the composition of their intestinal and lung microbiomes, which affect their sensitivity to colitis and lung inflammation.

Effects on inflammation 
Mouse PGLYRP1 plays a role in maintaining anti- and pro-inflammatory homeostasis in the intestine, skin, lungs, joints, eyes, and brain. PGLYRP1-deficient mice are more sensitive than wild type mice to dextran sodium sulfate (DSS)-induced colitis, which indicates that PGLYRP1 protects mice from DSS-induced colitis. However, in a mouse model of arthritis PGLYRP1-deficient mice develop more severe arthritis than wild type mice. Also, mice deficient in both PGLYRP1 and PGLYRP2 develop more severe arthritis than PGLYRP2-deficient mice, which are resistant to arthritis. These results indicate that PGLYRP2 promotes arthritis and that PGLYRP1 counteracts the pro-inflammatory effect of PGLYRP2. PGLYRP1-deficient mice also have impaired corneal wound healing compared with wild type mice, which indicates that PGLYRP1 promotes corneal wound healing.

PGLYRP1-deficient mice are more resistant than wild type mice to experimentally induced allergic asthma, atopic dermatitis, contact dermatitis, and psoriasis-like skin inflammation. These results indicate that mouse PGLYRP1 promotes lung and skin inflammation. These pro-inflammatory effects are due to increased numbers and activity of T helper 17 (Th17) cells and decreased numbers of T regulatory (Treg) cells and in the case of asthma also increased numbers of T helper 2 (Th2) cells and decreased numbers of plasmacytoid dendritic cells. The pro-inflammatory effect of PGLYRP1 on asthma depends on the PGLYRP1-regulated intestinal microbiome, because this increased resistance to experimentally induced allergic asthma could be transferred to wild type germ-free mice by microbiome transplant from PGLYRP1-deficient mice.

Cytotoxicity 
Mouse PGLYRP1 (Tag7) was reported to be cytotoxic for tumor cells and to function as a Tumor Necrosis Factor-α (TNF-α)-like cytokine. Subsequent experiments revealed that PGLYRP1 (Tag7) by itself does not have cytotoxic activity, but that PGLYRP1 (Tag7) forms a complex with heat shock protein 70 (Hsp70) and that only these complexes are cytotoxic for tumor cells, whereas PGLYRP1 (Tag7) by itself acts as an antagonist of cytotoxicity of PGLYRP1-Hsp70 complexes.

Interaction with host proteins and receptors 
Human and mouse PGLYRP1 (Tag7) bind heat shock protein 70 (Hsp70) in solution and PGLYRP1-Hsp70 complexes are also secreted by cytotoxic lymphocytes, and these complexes are cytotoxic for tumor cells. This cytotoxicity is antagonized by metastasin (S100A4) and heat shock-binding protein HspBP1. PGLYRP1-Hsp70 complexes bind to the TNFR1 (tumor necrosis factor receptor-1, which is a death receptor) and induce a cytotoxic effect via apoptosis and necroptosis. This cytotoxicity is associated with permeabilization of lysosomes and mitochondria. By contrast, free PGLYRP1 acts as a TNFR1 antagonist by binding to TNFR1 and inhibiting its activation by PGLYRP1-Hsp70 complexes. A peptide from human PGLYRP1 (amino acids 163-175) also inhibits the cytotoxic effects of TNF-α and PGLYRP1-Hsp70 complexes.

Human PGLYRP1 complexed with peptidoglycan or multimerized binds to and stimulates TREM-1 (triggering receptor expressed on myeloid cells-1), a receptor present on neutrophils, monocytes and macrophages that induces production of pro-inflammatory cytokines.

Medical relevance 
Genetic PGLYRP1 variants or changed expression of PGLYRP1 are often associated with various diseases. Patients with inflammatory bowel disease (IBD), which includes Crohn’s disease and ulcerative colitis, have significantly more frequent missense variants in PGLYRP1 gene (and also in the other three PGLYRP genes) than healthy controls. These results suggest that PGLYRP1 protects humans from these inflammatory diseases, and that mutations in PGLYRP1 gene are among the genetic factors predisposing to these diseases. PGLYRP1 variants are also associated with increased fetal hemoglobin in sickle cell disease.

Several diseases are associated with increased expression of PGLYRP1, including: atherosclerosis, myocardial infarction, sepsis, inflamed tissues in Crohn’s disease and ulcerative colitis, pulmonary fibrosis, asthma, chronic kidney disease, rheumatoid arthritis, gingival inflammation, osteoarthritis, cardiovascular events and death in kidney transplant patients, alopecia, heart failure, type I diabetes, infectious complications in hemodialysis, and thrombosis, consistent with pro-inflammatory effects of PGLYRP1. Lower expression of PGLYRP1 was found in endometriosis.

See also 

 Peptidoglycan recognition protein
 Peptidoglycan recognition protein 2
 Peptidoglycan recognition protein 3
 Peptidoglycan recognition protein 4
 Peptidoglycan
 Innate immune system
 Bacterial cell walls

References

Further reading 

 
 
 
 
 
 
 
 

Peptidoglycan recognition proteins